Frederick Michael Westcott (born 20 November 1941) is a former English cricketer.  Westcott was a right-handed batsman.  He was born in Corbridge, Northumberland.

Westcott made his debut for Durham against the Yorkshire Second XI in the 1965 Minor Counties Championship.  He played Minor counties cricket for Durham from 1965 to 1969, making 23 Minor Counties Championship appearances.  He made his List A debut against Nottinghamshire in the 1967 Gillette Cup.  In this match, he scored 47 runs before being dismissed by Barry Stead.  He made a further List A appearance against Worcestershire in the 1968 Gillette Cup.  He was dismissed for a duck in this match by Len Coldwell, with Worcestershire winning by 16 runs.

References

External links
Mike Westcott at ESPNcricinfo
Mike Westcott at CricketArchive

1941 births
Living people
People from Corbridge
Cricketers from Northumberland
English cricketers
Durham cricketers